= 1974 Egyptian October Paper referendum =

A referendum on the October Paper was held in Egypt on 15 May 1974. It was approved by 99.9% of voters, with a turnout of 97.8%.

== Results ==
Choice	Votes	%
For	8,246,937	99.95
Against	3,714	0.05
Total	8,250,651	100.00
Valid votes	8,250,651	99.94
Invalid/blank votes	4,903	0.06
Total votes	8,255,554	100.00
Registered voters/turnout	8,442,122	97.79
Source: Nohlen et al.
